Claude Flahault (9 July 1923 – 3 September 2015) was a French sailor. He competed in the 12m² Sharpie event at the 1956 Summer Olympics.

References

External links
 

1923 births
2015 deaths
French male sailors (sport)
Olympic sailors of France
Sailors at the 1956 Summer Olympics – 12 m2 Sharpie
Sportspeople from Nord (French department)